Phnom Sampov (also spelled Phnom Sampeau) is a limestone mountain and important religious site located in Battambang Province.

See also
Killing caves of Phnom Sampeau

References

External links

Mountains of Cambodia